Lowanna may refer to:

 Lowanna, New South Wales, a village
 Lowanna College, in Newborough, Victoria, Australia

See also 
 Lowana